Flytrap is the debut album by American rapper CJ Fly. It was released on December 9, 2016, by Pro Era and Cinematic Music Group. It features a guest of appearance of Canadian rapper and producer Devontée.

Track listing

Notes
 "Lethal Allure" and "Downfall" feature additional vocals by Eryn Allen Kane.

References

2016 albums
Cinematic Music Group albums
Pro Era albums
CJ Fly albums